This is a list of acts enacted by the United States Congress pertaining to education in the United States. Many laws related to education are codified under Title 20 of the United States Code. This list does not include resolutions designating a specific day, week, or month in honor of an educational goal.

See also 

 Education policy
 Education policy of the United States
 List of United States federal legislation

Lists of United States federal legislation
United States federal education legislation
Education policy in the United States
United States education-related lists